Pregnanolone, also known as eltanolone, is an endogenous inhibitory neurosteroid which is produced in the body from progesterone. It is closely related to allopregnanolone, which has similar properties.

Biological activity
Pregnanolone is a positive allosteric modulator of the GABAA receptor, as well as a negative allosteric modulator of the glycine receptor.

Biological function
Pregnanolone has sedative, anxiolytic, anesthetic, and anticonvulsant effects. During pregnancy, pregnanolone and allopregnanolone are involved in sedation and anesthesia of the fetus.

Biochemistry
Pregnanolone is synthesized from progesterone via the enzymes 5β-reductase and 3α-hydroxysteroid dehydrogenase, with 5β-dihydroprogesterone occurring as a metabolic intermediate. The elimination half-life of pregnanolone is between 0.9 and 3.5 hours.

Chemistry

Pregnanolone, also known as 3α,5β-tetrahydroprogesterone (3α,5β-THP) or as 5β-pregnan-3α-ol-20-one, is a naturally occurring pregnane steroid and a derivative of progesterone. Related compounds include allopregnanolone (3α,5α-THP; brexanolone), epipregnanolone (3β,5β-THP), hydroxydione, isopregnanolone (3β,5α-THP), and renanolone.

History
Pregnanolone was first isolated from the urine of pregnant women in 1937. Its anesthetic properties were first demonstrated in animals in 1957.

Research
Pregnanolone was investigated for clinical use as a general anesthetic under the name eltanolone, but produced unwanted side effects such as convulsions on occasion, and for this reason, was never marketed.

References

5β-Pregnanes
GABAA receptor positive allosteric modulators
GABAA-rho receptor negative allosteric modulators
General anesthetics
Glycine receptor antagonists
Neurosteroids
Pregnane X receptor agonists